Mindiri is an Austronesian language spoken by about 80 people in one village on the Rai Coast, Madang Province, Papua New Guinea.

References

Languages of Madang Province
Bel languages